Jacob Bunel (1558–1614) was a French painter. The son and pupil of François Bunel, he was born at Blois. He studied at Rome under Federigo Zuccaro, and on returning to France was made painter to the king, and worked with Pourbus and Toussaint du Breuil in the small gallery of the Louvre, burnt in 1661. He was an artist of great merit, and held in much esteem by Henri IV, who employed him at Fontainebleau and other royal residences. He painted 'The Descent of the Holy Ghost' for the chapel of that order in the church of the Grands Augustins at Paris, and for the church of the Feuillants an 'Assumption of the Virgin,' now in the Museum at Bordeaux, both of which pictures have been highly praised. Philip II of Spain, by whom likewise he was esteemed, commissioned him to paint for the cloister of the Escorial forty pictures, all of which have now disappeared. He died in Paris in 1614.

He was the brother of François Bunel the Younger, and married the painter Marguerite Bahuche, who helped him and Toussaint Dubreuil with decorations for the Petite Galerie of the Louvre (since reconstruction after a fire in 1661, called Galerie d'Apollon of the Louvre Museum). He was the teacher of Claude Vignon.

References

Attribution:
 

16th-century French painters
French male painters
17th-century French painters
1568 births
1614 deaths
Artists from Blois
Court painters